NebulaGraph is an open-source distributed graph database built for super large-scale graphs with milliseconds of latency. NebulaGraph adopts the Apache 2.0 license and  also  comes with a wide range of data visualization tools.

History 
NebulaGraph was developed in 2018 by Vesoft Inc. with the aim  of providing  stable and reliable infrastructure software to enterprises across the globe. In May 2019, NebulaGraph  was open-sourced on GitHub and its alpha version was released same year.

In June 2020, NebulaGraph raised $8M in a series pre-A funding round led by Redpoint China Ventures and Matrix Partners China.

In June 2019,  NebulaGraph 1.0 GA version was released while version  2.0 GA  was released in March 2021. The latest version 3.0.2 of Nebula was released in March 2022.

See also
Graph database

References

External links 

Free database management systems
Document-oriented databases
Distributed computing architecture
Key-value databases
Structured storage
Graph databases